is an action video game developed and published by Marvelous. The game is the third installment in the universe that began with Fate/Extra and the second one to be released outside of Japan. It was first announced in March 2016 and released in Japan in November 2016 for the PlayStation 4 and PlayStation Vita consoles; its release in North America and Europe occurred in January 2017. Nintendo Switch and Microsoft Windows versions were released in July 2017 for all three regions. The game's plot involved the conflict between two factions led by Nero and Tamamo from Fate/Extra fighting each other over control of the Moon Cell and the Holy Grail. They are soon joined by a third faction led by Altera who has the intent of destroying civilization as well as Saber from Fate/stay night who wishes to stop the conflict between the three factions. A direct sequel titled Fate/Extella Link was released for PS4 in Japan in 2018, and later worldwide for PS4, Switch and PC in 2019.

Gameplay
Fate/Extella is a single-player action game in which the player takes the role of a "master", who works together with spirits known as servants, who fight large numbers of enemies similar to Dynasty Warriors. The player can customize the master, choosing their name and gender. There are sixteen playable servants in the game, divided into eight classes: Saber, Archer, Lancer, Caster, Assassin, Rider, Berserker, and Extra Class. Different servants have different fighting styles: the Saber swordswoman Nero Claudius has powerful sword skills and balanced abilities; the Caster magus Tamamo no Mae can use magic skills and raw firepower but lower defense; and the Saber swordswoman Attila uses a violent battle style.

As servants, the player can run around on the battlefield and attack with strong or weak attacks; by using certain combinations of these, the player can trigger a combo attack. The player can protect themselves from enemy attacks by guarding, or by avoiding the attack with an aerial dash. By consuming some of a gauge, the player can use the special attack Extella Maneuver, where strikes to single enemies also deal damage to other enemies surrounding it. Servants can be powered up through the use of "form change", a gameplay mechanic that alters their appearance and weapons, allowing them to take down nearby enemies with ease. Transformations differ depending on the character: for example, Nero's is based on fire, while Tamamo no Mae's is based on snow.

A mode called Area Supremacy Battle is available, in which Servants attack sectors and try to obtain Regime Matrices – keys that give control over the area. Each sector has a different number of keys; the player wins by collecting fifteen of them. In addition to just fighting enemies, the player also needs to protect their own sector in this mode.

Synopsis

Characters and setting
The game is set after the events of the Holy Grail War in the first game Fate/Extra. Nero and her master (whose true name is Hakuno Kishinami) have won the war, giving them control over the Moon Cell Automaton computer, which has the power to grant a wish. As proof of their kingship, they have obtained the Regalia ring, with which they rule over the former enemy servants; they are however confronted by a new enemy, which also holds a Regalia. The story is told from the perspectives of Nero, Tamamo no Mae and Altera (also known as Attila); in addition to the main story, the game also includes side stories focusing on the other servants.

Development
Fate/Extella is being developed by Marvelous, and is written by Kinoko Nasu and Hikaru Sakurai, with character designs by Aruko Wada. When the game was announced in March 2016, development was 60% finished. Development began after the previous Fate game, Fate/Extra CCC, was finished. It is written as an independent story, with Takashi Takeuchi describing it as not being a counter to Fate/stay night or a sequel to Extra; according to Nasu, the story still "inherits the blood of Extra".

Marvelous has developed alternative costumes for characters as downloadable content: one such costume, for Gilgamesh, had to be redesigned for "various reasons". While Marvelous did not elaborate, some journalists speculated that it was due to its resemblance to Nazi officer uniforms.

Release
The game was released for the PlayStation 4 and the PlayStation Vita by Marvelous on November 10, 2016 in Japan and on January 20, 2017 in Europe and Australia, and by Xseed Games in North America on January 17, 2017. A Nintendo Switch version was also planned. The PlayStation 4 version would receive a patch that adds support for the PlayStation 4 Pro hardware.

In Japan, multiple editions of the game were made available: the "Velber Box" includes one copy of the game for the PlayStation 4 and one for the PlayStation Vita, a box with art by Wada, an oppai ("breast") mousepad depicting a Saber servant, a book with development information and a glossary, a download code for alternative costumes for the servants Nero and Gilgamesh; the "Regalia Box" includes one copy of the game for either platform, the box, the book, and a download code for one of the costumes included in the Velber Box. All Japanese copies of the game also come with a download code for two additional costumes, for Nero and Artoria Pendragon. Copies bought at Loppi or HMV also include one more costume, for a male character. Meanwhile, Japanese digital purchases include a "Dragon Magician Girl" costume for Elizabeth Bathory. Additional downloadable costumes will be published after the game's release, including a set of nine swimsuits, one set of seven women's clothes, one set of nine men's clothes, and one of three Fate/stay night costumes.

A Nintendo Direct held on April 12, 2017 announced that the game would be released on Nintendo Switch on July 20, 2017 in Japan, in Europe and Australia on July 21, and in North America on July 25. The game was bundled with DLC costumes for all characters for free, including Nero's Unshackled Bride outfit (the revealing version of Saber Bride outfit) exclusively on Nintendo Switch. Unlike the PlayStation 4 and PlayStation Vita versions, the Nintendo Switch version of the game allows players to choose four languages, Japanese, English, Traditional Chinese and Korean. The Japanese trailer of the game announced the Limited Box Edition which includes Nero Pouch and the game itself.

On July 5, 2017, a Microsoft Windows version was announced for release on July 25, coinciding with the North American launch of the Nintendo Switch version.

Marvelous Inc. released Fate/Extella: The Umbral Star for mobile device on July 22, 2020 for Japan region only.

Reception

It sold 140,375 units in Japan as of its first week

References

External links
 

2016 video games
PlayStation 4 games
PlayStation Vita games
Nintendo Switch games
Action video games
Hack and slash games
Fate/stay night video games
Video games featuring protagonists of selectable gender
Windows games
Xseed Games games
Single-player video games